The Chevrolet AK Series truck was a light duty truck sold under the Chevrolet brand, with production beginning in 1941 until 1947. It used the GM A platform, shared with the Chevrolet Deluxe. The AK series was also branded and sold at GMC locations, with the primary visual difference being the Chevrolet had vertical bars in the grille, while the GMC had horizontal bars. The 1941-45 GMC models were sold as C-Series and became the E-Series for the 1946 and 1947 model years (CC-Series / EC-Series for the conventional cab models and CF-Series / EF-Series for the COE ones).

The AK series represented an appearance split from previous Chevrolet products where the passenger cars and pickup trucks shared a common appearance, as demonstrated in the Chevrolet Master truck. The Chevrolet Deluxe was an all-new appearance when it was introduced in 1941, and shared much of its mechanicals with the third generation Chevrolet Suburban. The truck is considered the second real truck produced by General Motors since trucks preceding the Master trucks were completely car-based, and thus coupe utilities.

It was replaced with the Advance-Design, that was also sold as a GMC.

The truck used by the Creeper in the Jeepers Creepers film franchise is a 1941 model of the Chevrolet AK Series COE truck.

The resourceful crime-fighter, activist, and action-hero Angus MacGyver drives a beige-and-brown 1946 Chevy pickup during some of his episodes. Like his teal-blue '57 Chevy Nomad with white roof and trim-accents, this vehicle was left to him by his late grandfather, Harry Jackson.

Gallery

See also
 List of GM platforms
 Dodge T-, V-, W-Series, a contemporaneous American truck series with Art Deco / Streamline Moderne styling

References

External links

Pickup trucks
Advance Design
AK Series
1940s cars
Rear-wheel-drive vehicles
Motor vehicles manufactured in the United States
Vans
Panel trucks